The 2001 Orange Bowl, designated as the BCS National Championship Game, was a college football bowl game played to determine a national champion in the National Collegiate Athletic Association's Division I Football Bowl Subdivision (FBS) for the 2000 season. It was played at Pro Player Stadium in Miami Gardens, Florida, on January 3, 2001, with kickoff at 8:00 p.m. EST and television coverage by ABC. The 67th playing of the Orange Bowl, it was the culminating game of the 2000–01 bowl season.

The championship featured the top-ranked Oklahoma Sooners from the Big 12 Conference defeating the second-ranked and defending national champion Florida State Seminoles from the Atlantic Coast Conference in a defensive battle, 13–2. The win gave Oklahoma head coach Bob Stoops his first national championship, in just his second season as the coach of the Sooners.

Teams
The game featured No. 1 Oklahoma and No. 2 Florida State. The teams had previously met four times, with Oklahoma holding a 3–1 edge. Their most recent meeting had been in the 1981 Orange Bowl, which was won by Oklahoma, 18–17.

Florida State

Defending champion Florida State entered the National Championship game with an 11–1 record, having clinched the conference title winning all 8 of their Atlantic Coast Conference (ACC) regular season games. Florida State had appeared in both prior BCS National Championship games, having lost the inaugural edition 1999 Fiesta Bowl and winning the 2000 Sugar Bowl.

Oklahoma

Oklahoma entered the National Championship game with a 12–0 record, having won all 8 of their Big 12 Conference regular season games, followed by a win over Kansas State in the Big 12 Championship Game. This was Oklahoma's first BCS National Championship game appearance.

Game summary
The only points scored in the first half came after the two teams exchanged turnovers on consecutive plays, which both occurred on the Oklahoma side of the field. First, Sooners receiver Andre Woolfolk fumbled after a 22-yard reception, with Clevan Thomas recovering at the Oklahoma 47. Then, a pass by Florida State quarterback Chris Weinke was intercepted by Torrance Marshall, which eventually led to a 27-yard field goal 7:44 into the game.

On the Sooners' next possession, an interception by Josh Heupel — the Sooners' second and final turnover of the night — did not lead to any Florida State points.

Between the 7:45 mark of the second quarter and the 8:05 mark of the third, the closest each team came to scoring was on a missed field goal. Oklahoma kicker Tim Duncan would then be successful on his next attempt, giving the Sooners a 6–0 lead with 4:24 left in the third quarter.

Throughout the second half, Florida State sustained some drives, but never made it to Oklahoma's red zone. Early in the fourth quarter, however, the Seminoles had at least two shots at a game-tying touchdown (and go-ahead extra-point) on plays that started on the OU 35-yard line. Facing 2nd-and-10 and 4th-and-10, Weinke twice threw deep passes towards the end zone. On second down, Robert Morgan "laid out beautifully" in the end zone, making a diving effort, but had the ball go "through his hands." Then, on fourth down, Weinke aimed for Anquan Boldin inside the Oklahoma 5-yard line, but the play was broken up by freshman Derrick Strait, who had also been the defender covering the aforementioned play.

Five minutes later, however, Oklahoma extended its lead, scoring the only touchdown of the game. The play was set up by the Sooners' defense recovering a fumble by Weinke, who was running for a first down at around the Seminoles' 15-yard line. Two plays later, OU running back Quentin Griffin ran the ball in to put the Sooners up 12–0 (13–0 after the extra-point) with 7:46 left to play.

Florida State's only score of the game came with 55 seconds left in the game, when, after a high snap, Oklahoma punter Jeff Ferguson alertly ran the ball into his own end zone for a safety to avoid giving Florida State the ball close to the Oklahoma goal line in a two-possession game.

After the Seminoles subsequently received the ball, Weinke's 29-yard pass into the end zone was intercepted by Ontei Jones with 16 seconds left. This allowed the Oklahoma Sooners to run out the clock and celebrate their first national championship in 15 years.

Statistics

Aftermath
Florida State's national dominance officially ended after this night. Their ugly, sloppy performance actually foreshadowed what would follow in the near future. This game marked the ending of a 14-year stretch in which the Seminoles finished in the final AP and or Coaches top four. They would not finish in the top four of the polls again until 2013 when they won the BCS National Championship led by another Heisman winning signal-caller, Jameis Winston.

Oklahoma was just in their second season in the Bob Stoops era. Their victory over FSU would just be the beginning of a celebrated 18-year career in which the Sooners appeared in 11 BCS Bowls, which were the second most in that timespan behind Ohio State's 12 (albeit they had three different coaches from 2000 to 2016). The Sooners would return to three more national championship games, but would fall short in all three under Stoops.

References

Orange Bowl
Orange Bowl
Florida State Seminoles football bowl games
Oklahoma Sooners football bowl games
BCS National Championship Game
January 2001 sports events in the United States